Wigan Rovers Football Club is an English football team based in Wigan, Greater Manchester. They play the Wigan & District Amateur League, though they have played in the FA Cup during the 1960s and the FA Vase during the 1970s, eventually becoming founding members of the North West Counties Football League in 1982. However, they were only members for one season.

History
Wigan Rovers joined the Cheshire County League in 1959. After two years the club left the league to join the second division of the Lancashire Combination. In 1966, the team won the league and were promoted to the first division. The club entered the FA Cup on four occasions between 1967 and 1973, and the FA Vase on four occasions between 1974 and 1978. Their best result in the FA Cup was to win a replay against Horwich RMI in 1968–69, and their best result in the FA Vase was to get to the Second Round in 1975–76 where they were knocked out by Prescot Town.

Wigan Rovers were founding members of the North West Counties League in the 1982–83 but left after just one season in Division Three. The club then joined the West Lancashire League Division One, but were relegated after one season. The team slowly declined over the next few years before dropping out of the league in 1994.

Since then, a team named Wigan Rovers became part of the local Wigan & District Amateur League, winning the title in 1999–2000.

Colours and badge
The club's home colours are red and black striped shirt, black shorts and socks. Away colours are green and white striped shirt, green shorts and white socks both kits with the badge of a picture of a lion rampant above a football.

Honours
Lancashire Combination Division Two
Champions 1965–66
Wigan & District Amateur League
Champions 1999–2000

Records
FA Cup
First Qualifying Round Replay 1968–69
FA Vase
Second Round 1975–76

References

External links
Official website

Football clubs in England
Sport in Wigan
Association football clubs established in 1959
1959 establishments in England
Lancashire Combination
North West Counties Football League clubs
West Lancashire Football League
Cheshire County League clubs